Orange Moon Over Brooklyn is the second studio album by American rapper Pumpkinhead. It was released by Soulspasm Records and distributed by Rawkus Records on August 23, 2005.

Critical reception

Max Herman of XLR8R wrote, "Rocking hard over the crisp beats of Marco Polo, Pumpkinhead keeps his wordplay sharp yet graspable throughout." He called it "a testament to Pumpkinhead's undying dedication to hip-hop." Sophie Doran of Junkee commented that "Pumpkinhead is far from shy about paying tribute to the elders of the genre and the LP is littered with references to the pioneers and his appreciation for them and the art form, yet he still represents contemporary underground and particularly NY style raps exceptionally."

Track listing

References

External links
 

2005 albums
Hip hop albums by American artists
Albums produced by Marco Polo